Amuropaludina pachya is a species of freshwater snail with a gill and an operculum, an aquatic gastropod mollusk in the family Viviparidae.

Distribution 
This species is found in the central and lower parts of the Amur River basin, in Russia. The type locality is the Amur River ("le fleuve Amour").

Major threats include river pollution.

Description 
The width of the shell is 21 mm. The height of the shell is 34 mm.

References

Viviparidae